Daniel Ruiz-Bazán Justa (born 28 June 1951), commonly known as Dani, is a Spanish former footballer who played as a striker. 

During his career he played almost exclusively for Athletic Bilbao, scoring nearly 200 competitive goals (exactly 199) in more than one decade with the first team. He was a penalty kick specialist.

Club career
Born in Sopuerta, Biscay, Dani played his youth football in various clubs in the Basque Country. He signed with Athletic Bilbao in 1971 at the age of 20, spending one full season with the reserve side in the Tercera División.

After two years loaned at neighbouring Barakaldo CF of the Segunda División, Dani returned to his alma mater, scoring in double digits for nine of the following ten years. His first La Liga match occurred on 29 September 1974 in a 3–0 away loss against Valencia CF and, in the 1976–77 season, as the Lions reached the final of the UEFA Cup and the Copa del Rey, also finishing third in the league, he netted a total of 29 goals in 46 official games. In the latter competition, during his 12-year stint with the club, he reached the 20-goal mark twice.

Dani helped Athletic to back-to-back league titles in his later years (1983–84), although he was only a fringe player in the latter campaign – ten matches, three goals – due to the emergence of another youth product of the club, Manuel Sarabia. He would be further pushed down the pecking order after the first-team promotion of Julio Salinas, and eventually retired in June 1986 at the age of 35, having scored 147 league goals in 302 appearances.

Dani's total of 11 goals in European competition stood as a club record for 25 years, until passed by Fernando Llorente in 2012.

International career
Dani played 25 matches and scored ten goals for Spain, during four years and two days. His debut came on 21 September 1977, in a 2–1 friendly win in Switzerland.

Dani represented his country in both the 1978 FIFA World Cup and UEFA Euro 1980, respectively scoring against Austria and England (1–2 defeats and group stage exit in both cases).

International goals
Scores and results list Spain's goal tally first, score column indicates score after each Dani goal.

Honours
Athletic Bilbao
La Liga: 1982–83, 1983–84
Copa del Rey: 1983–84
Supercopa de España: 1984
UEFA Cup runner-up: 1976–77

References

External links

1951 births
Living people
People from Enkarterri
Spanish footballers
Footballers from the Basque Country (autonomous community)
Association football forwards
La Liga players
Segunda División players
CD Getxo players
CD Laudio players
Bilbao Athletic footballers
Athletic Bilbao footballers
Barakaldo CF footballers
Spain under-21 international footballers
Spain amateur international footballers
Spain B international footballers
Spain international footballers
1978 FIFA World Cup players
UEFA Euro 1980 players
Basque Country international footballers
Sportspeople from Biscay